Cheddar Man is a human male fossil found in Gough's Cave in Cheddar Gorge, Somerset, England. The skeletal remains date to around the mid-to-late 9th millennium BC, corresponding to the Mesolithic period, and it appears that he died a violent death. A large crater-like lesion just above the skull's right orbit suggests that the man may have also been suffering from a bone infection.

Excavated in 1903, Cheddar Man is Britain's oldest near-complete human skeleton. The remains are kept by London's Natural History Museum, in the Human Evolution gallery.

Analysis of his nuclear DNA indicates that he was a typical member of the Western European hunter-gatherer population at the time, with a most likely inferred phenotype of blue-green eyes, dark brown or black hair, and dark or dark-to-black skin, with no genetic adaption for lactase persistence into adulthood.

Archaeological context

The near-complete skeleton, an adult male who probably died in his early twenties, was discovered in 1903 by labourers digging a drainage ditch. No grave goods have been reliably associated with the skeleton. It is likely that Cheddar Man was moved to the cave after death as part of what may have been a Mesolithic funerary practice, although it is also possible that he simply died in situ.

Cheddar Man has been directly radiocarbon dated on two separate occasions, giving calibrated dates of 8540-7990 BC and 8470-8230 BC.

Morphology

Proportionally, he is in most respects similar to modern Europeans, and may be described as 'cold-adapted', but with a high crural index (thigh length to leg length ratio) which is much higher than the modern European average and higher even than the modern sub-Saharan African average, and a high tibia length-to-trunk height ratio similar to modern North Africans.

Genetics

Phenotype
Nuclear DNA was extracted from the petrous part of the temporal bone by a team from the Natural History Museum in 2018. While the relevant genetic markers on the Cheddar Man genome have low sequencing coverage, limiting the accuracy of the predictions, they suggest (based on their associations in modern populations whose phenotypes are known) that he most likely had intermediate (blue-green) eye colour, dark brown or black curly or wavy hair, and dark or dark-to-black skin, with no derived allele for lactase persistence. These features are typical of the Western European population of the time, now known as Western Hunter-Gatherers, another example being Loschbour man discovered in Luxembourg. This population forms about 10%, on average, of the ancestry of Britons without a recent family history of immigration. Brown eyes, lactose tolerance, and light skin are common in the modern population of the area. These genes came from later immigration, most of it ultimately from two major waves, the first of Neolithic farmers from the Near East, another of Bronze Age pastoralists, most likely speakers of Indo-European languages, from the Pontic steppe.

Ancestry
About 85% of his ancestry can be modelled as coming from the ~14,000–7,000-year-old Villabruna genetic cluster, and only c. 15% from the Goyet Q2 cave cluster whose genes are found in association with the Late Upper Palaeolithic Magdalenian culture. He is not closely related to the earlier Magdalenian individuals found in the same cave, whose ancestry is entirely from the Goyet cluster. The genomes of all British Mesolithic individuals sequenced to date other than Cheddar Man can be modelled as only Villabruna-related (WHG) ancestry, without additional Goyet-related admixture.

Uniparental haplogroups

Cheddar Man's Y-DNA belonged to an ancient sister branch of modern I2-L38 (I2a2). The I2a2 subclade is still extant in males of the modern British Isles and across other parts of Europe.
The mitochondrial DNA of Cheddar Man was discovered to be haplogroup U5b1 by a Natural History Museum study in 2018 using next generation sequencing. Some 65% of western European Mesolithic hunter-gatherers had haplogroup U5; today it is widely distributed, at lower frequencies, across western Eurasia and northern Africa. In 1996, Bryan Sykes of the University of Oxford first sequenced the mitochondrial DNA from one of Cheddar Man's molars as U5a using PCR testing. The difference between the older result and the 2018 Natural History Museum result was attributed to the use of older PCR technology and possible contamination.

In popular culture

Soon after the discovery of the skeleton, Cheddar Man became part of a discourse of British nationalism and cultural heritage, with an initially proposed age of 40,000-80,000 years. The specimen was heralded by some as the 'first Englishman'.

The analysis of Cheddar Man's mitochondrial DNA by Bryan Sykes in 1996 was broadcast on a regional television programme in the UK, Once Upon a Time in the West. The programme emphasised the connection between Cheddar Man and a history teacher from a local school, both of whom belonged to mitochondrial DNA haplogroup U5, although this cannot demonstrate a direct connection between Cheddar Man and this individual, and many people with the same mtDNA haplogroup could probably be found even within the local area. The programme generated coverage in national and international media, which focused mainly on the supposed relationship between Cheddar Man and the local history teacher, and failed to emphasise that mitochondrial DNA is only passed on through the mother, and makes up only a small proportion of an individual's genome. 
In 2018 the publication of the genetics study by Brace et al. and subsequent facial reconstruction of a dark-skinned and blue-eyed Cheddar Man resulted in widespread media coverage which again described Cheddar Man as the 'first Brit', and led to discussion on social media involving themes of immigration, national identity, race, and Brexit. The results gave evidence that Cheddar Man, and the wave of anatomically modern humans he was part of, originated in the Middle East. This suggests that his ancestors would have left Africa, moved into the Middle East and later headed west into Europe, before eventually traversing Doggerland, a land bridge which connected Britain to continental Europe. It is estimated that 10% of the genomes of modern white British comes from this population of anatomically modern humans. The study was interpreted both as an anti-racist response to anti-immigration arguments and as left-wing academic propaganda. Cheddar Man's predicted dark skin colour was "strongly suggested" through exhaustive DNA studies. The current scientific consensus holds that populations living in Europe became lighter-skinned over time because pale skin absorbs more sunlight, which is required to produce enough vitamin D. There are a handful of genetic variations linked to lighter skin; it was determined in the study that Cheddar Man had “ancestral” versions of all these genes, strongly suggesting he would have had “dark to black” skin tone, but combined with blue eyes.

See also 

 Boxgrove
 Genetic history of the British Isles
 List of human evolution fossils
 List of prehistoric structures in Great Britain
 Paviland

Notes

References

External links

Lyall, Sarah (24 March 1997). "Tracing Your Family Tree to Cheddar Man's Mum". New York Times. Retrieved 9 February 2018.
Cheddar Man DNA Secrets ~ with Dr. Selina Brace. Video on YouTube explaining how the Ancient DNA was used.

Genetics in the United Kingdom
History of Somerset
Mendip Hills
Mesolithic Homo sapiens fossils
1903 archaeological discoveries
Prehistoric Britain
Stone Age Britain